"Cuando Respiro En Tu Boca" (When I Breath in Your Mouth) is an alternative rock song by Chilean rock band Lucybell. Released as third single from their debut album Peces on 1995. The song already have a good rotation around Chilean radios. Is considered a classic song of the band. The music video was directed by Pepe Maldonado and was composed by Claudio Valenzuela. Is the first track of the album.

Track listing 
Peces (Album version)
 "Cuando Respiro En Tu Boca" –

Fonseca version 

The song was covered by Colombian musician Fonseca during her performance at the "Tour Éxito 2011" and "Ilusión World Tour". "Cuando Respiro En Tu Boca", was later included in the reissue for his fourth album Ilusión, adding the sign "+" as representation of the new material and strategy to boost sales in other countries. The song was produced by Andres Levin, the same Fonseca and co-produced by Santiago Muñoz.

Track listing 
Album version 
 "Cuando Respiro En Tu Boca" –

Credits and personnel 
Recording
Recorded at Fun MAchine – Pirate Studios and mixed at PolaPola Studios Brooklyn, New York City.

Personnel

Songwriting – Cluadio Valenzuela
Production – Andres Levin, Santiago Muñoz and Juan Fernando Fonseca
Vocal engineering and recording – Ray Aldaco
Music recording – Andres Levin and Juan Fernando Fonseca

Assistant vocal recording – Juan Fernando Fonseca
Mixing – Andy Baldwin

Credits adapted from the liner notes of Ilusión, Sony Music Latin, 10 Music.

References 

1995 singles
Spanish-language songs
Fonseca (singer) songs
1995 songs